This table displays the top-rated primetime television series of the 1968–69 season as measured by Nielsen Media Research.

References

1968 in American television
1969 in American television
1968-related lists
1969-related lists
Lists of American television series